Route 129 is a major arterial boulevard state highway in the capital city of Trenton, New Jersey. The highway runs along Canal Boulevard, a four-lane arterial through portions of Trenton, serving as an alternative highway to its parent, Route 29. The route begins at an intersection with Lamberton Road in Hamilton Township, heads northward along the River Line maintained by New Jersey Transit until terminating at an interchange with U.S. Route 1 (US 1; the Trenton Freeway).

The original use of Route 129 opened in 1961 on what is now Interstate 295 (I-295) from the Scudder Falls Bridge to Scotch Road in Trenton. The route was replaced in 1974 by I-95 (re-designated as I-295 in 2018), while the route's current incarnation opened in September 1993 along a former portion of the Delaware and Raritan Canal. The route has remained virtually untouched since its opening.

Route description

Route 129 begins at an intersection with Lamberton Road on the Delaware River in Hamilton Township.  The highway proceeds northward, passing through small fields and tree patches until reaching railroad tracks, where the route turns to the northwest, paralleling its parent, the Route 29 freeway to the west. Route 129 then becomes a divided highway, intersecting with an onramp to Route 29 and passing to the east of a large factory. From there, the highway merges back together and comes upon a partial interchange with Route 29. Route 129 itself continues along the railroad tracks on Canal Boulevard, entering the city of Trenton, where it becomes a divided highway once again.

At an intersection with Mercer County Route 650 (Lalor Street), Route 129 develops a grassy median and heads along the industrial portion of the city. With NJ Transit's River Line paralleling the highway, the state road serves access to large factories, a large residential district and a train station between Lalor Street and Cass Street. Route 129 continues northward along Canal, crossing under US 206 (South Broad Street) with a southbound exit to that road. It crosses Hamilton Avenue before reaching an interchange with US 1, where Route 129 ends and Canal Boulevard's right of way merges into the Trenton Freeway. This interchange has access to northbound US 1 and from southbound US 1, westbound Route 33, and Market Street.

History
Route 129 originates as the earliest designation on a freeway from the Scudder Falls Bridge on the Delaware River to the interchange with Scotch Road, which opened in 1961. At that point, the new freeway was proposed with an eastward extension to US 1. However, by 1974, Route 129 was re-designated as a portion of I-95, and is now designated as I-295. The current incarnation of Route 129 was constructed along a former portion of the Delaware and Raritan Canal as an alternate arterial boulevard to Route 29 that opened in September 1993 from Lamberton Road to US 1 at a cost of $24.185 million (1993 USD) by the George Harms Construction Company. The route has remained virtually untouched since.

Major intersections

See also

References

External links

New Jersey Roads - NJ 129
New Jersey Highway Ends: 129
Speed Limits for State Roads: Route 129

State highways in New Jersey
Trenton, New Jersey
Transportation in Mercer County, New Jersey